The 2020–21 Notre Dame Fighting Irish women's basketball team represented the University of Notre Dame during the 2020–21 NCAA Division I women's basketball season. The Fighting Irish were led by first year head coach Niele Ivey and played their home games at Purcell Pavilion as members of the Atlantic Coast Conference.

The Fighting Irish finished the season 10–10 and 8–7 in ACC play to finish in sixth place.  In the ACC tournament, they lost to Clemson in the Second Round.  They were not invited to the NCAA tournament or the WNIT.

Previous season
The Fighting Irish finished the 2019–20 season at 13–18 and 8–10 in ACC play to finish in a tie for ninth place.  As the tenth seed in the ACC tournament, they lost to Pittsburgh in the First Round.  The NCAA tournament and WNIT were cancelled due to the COVID-19 outbreak.

Offseason

Departures

Incoming transfers

2020 recruiting class

Source:

Roster

Schedule and results

Source:

|-
!colspan=9 style=| Non-conference Regular season

|-
!colspan=9 style=| ACC Regular season

|-
!colspan=9 style=| ACC Women's Tournament
|-

Rankings
2020–21 NCAA Division I women's basketball rankings

References

Notre Dame Fighting Irish women's basketball seasons
Notre Dame
Notre Dame Fighting Irish
Notre Dame Fighting Irish